The Capital City of Warsaw, simply known as Warsaw, was an independent city of Warsaw, that functioned as the voivodeship of Poland, from 1919 to 1939. In 1931, it had a population of 1 171 898, and the area of 123 km². It was an enclave surrounded by the Warsaw Voivodeship.

Administration subdivisions
It was divided into 4 counties. These were:
South Warsaw County (area 50 km², pop. 307 100),
North Warsaw County (area 31 km², pop. 478 200),
Warsaw Praga County (area 43 km², pop. 176 100),
Warsaw Śródmieście County (area 10 km², pop. 218 100).

Citations

Notes

References 

States and territories established in 1919
States and territories disestablished in 1939
Former voivodeships of the Second Polish Republic
Capital City of Warsaw
Capital City of Warsaw
Independent cities
Former enclaves